Myung Ji-yun (명지연, born 1975) is a South Korean actress.

Television
 2018: The Undateables
 2018: Misty
 2014: Everybody, Kimchi! - Im Soo-jin
 2010: Athena: Goddess of War - Hong Soo-jin
 2009: Iris - Hong Soo-jin
 2005: Coma - Kang Soo-jin
 2003: 사랑의 향기 (Scent of Love) - Heo Mi-jeong
 1997: 파랑새는 있다 (There's a Bluebird) - Joon-mi

Films
 2010: Iris the Movie - Hong Soo-jin
 2005: 틈 (Aperture) - Kang Soo-jin
 2005: 생일파티 (Birthday Party) - Chul-yeon
 2003: Too Beautiful to Lie - Hwa-sook
 2002: 하얀 방 (White Room) - Yoo-sil, In-mi
 2001: 휴머니스트 (The Humanist) - Sister Rosa
 2000: 실제상황 (Real Fiction) - flower shop owner
 1999: 장롱 (Wardrobe) - Chul-yeon
 1999: 심판 (Judgment) - Chul-yeon
 1998: 아름다운 시절 (Spring in My Hometown) - Young-sook
 1997: 바리케이드 (Barricade) - Bhutto

References

South Korean television actresses
South Korean film actresses
1975 births
Living people
21st-century South Korean actresses